Shatsky (masculine, Cyrillic: Шацкий), Shatskaya (feminine, Cyrillic: Шацкая), or Shatskoye (neuter, Cyrillic: Шацкое) may refer to:
Shatsky (surname)
Shatskiy Hill in Antarctica 
Shatsky District in Ryazan Oblast, Russia
Shatskyi Lakes in Ukraine
Shatsky Rise, a plateau in the north-west Pacific Ocean 
Shatskoye Urban Settlement, a municipal formation which the town of district significance of Shatsk in Shatsky District of Ryazan Oblast, Russia is incorporated as
Shatsk Raion (Shatsky District), a district of Volyn Oblast, Ukraine
Shatskaya (rural locality), a rural locality (a sloboda) in Sapozhkovsky District of Ryazan Oblast, Russia

See also
Richard Schatzki
Olivier Schatzky